The blackbar drum (Pareques iwamotoi) is a species of fish in the family Sciaenidae. It is located on the shores of the Caribbean Sea.

References

Sciaenidae
i
Fish described in 1988